Márta Svéd (1910 – 30 September 2005) was a Hungarian mathematician who moved to Australia in the 1930s and became a teacher of mathematics at the University of Adelaide. She was 75 years old when she completed her PhD in 1985. She wrote the textbook Journey into Geometries (1991), and won the BH Neumann Award in 1994 for her contributions to mathematics learning in Australia.

Early life
Márta Svéd was in the same high school class in Budapest as Esther Klein. She became interested in mathematics through Középiskolai Matematikai Lapok (KöMaL), a Hungarian magazine for high school mathematicians, and through its problem-solving column, where Paul Erdős was also a regular solver.

She took third place in her year's offering of the Hungarian national high school mathematics competition, ahead of Pál Turán but behind her future husband, civil engineer George Svéd. Due to  the restrictions placed on Jews in Hungary in the late 1920s, only two students from their class could study science or mathematics at the university in Budapest; Márta took the mathematics position, and Klein studied physics instead.

Later life
Svéd and her husband moved to Australia in 1939 and had one son and one daughter. She became the head of the mathematics department at Wilderness School, a private Adelaide high school for girls, and in the same year helped found Australia's first high school mathematics magazine.

Her old friend Klein, meanwhile, had married mathematician George Szekeres and escaped Europe for Shanghai; after World War II, the Szekeres and Svéd families shared a small apartment in Adelaide.

Svéd died on 30 September 2005, two days after the death of her friends, George and Esther Szekeres, who died within an hour of each other. She was interred at Centennial Park Cemetery, Pasadena, Mitcham City, South Australia.

Contributions
In 1985, Svéd completed a PhD at the University of Adelaide, at age 75. Her dissertation, On finite linear and Baer structures, concerned finite geometry, and was supervised by Rey Casse. Her 1991 book, Journey into Geometries (MAA Spectrum), has been described by reviewer David A. Thomas as an "Alice-in-Wonderland-type journey into non-Euclidean geometry", written in a conversational style.

Svéd's posthumously-published book Two Lives and a Bonus (Peacock Publications, 2006) documents her early life in Budapest.

Awards and honours
Svéd won the BH Neumann Award of the Australian Mathematics Trust in 1994. The award citation credited her in particular for the flourishing of mathematics competitions in Australia and the success of Australia in international mathematics competitions.

The University of Adelaide offers a scholarship for women mathematicians named in memory of Svéd.

References

Year of birth uncertain
Date of birth missing
2005 deaths
Australian mathematicians
Australian people of Hungarian-Jewish descent
Hungarian Jews
20th-century Hungarian mathematicians
Women mathematicians
University of Adelaide alumni
Academic staff of the University of Adelaide
1910 births